General elections were held in the Isle of Man between 27 October and 6 November 1919. Independent candidates won a majority of seats in the House of Keys.

Electoral system
The 24 members of the House of Keys were elected from 11 constituencies, which had between one and three seats.

Campaign
A total of 47 candidates contested the elections; 28 independents, 11 from the Manx Labour Party, 5 from the National Party and three from the Liberal Party. There was only one candidate in Castletown, who was elected unopposed.

Results

By constituency

Aftermath
Following the elections, W.C. Southward (Ayre), J.R. Kerruish (Garff), J. Cunningham (Douglas North) and J. Qualtrough (Rushen) were elevated to the Legislative Council. By-elections were subsequently held for their replacements in mid-December:

References

General election
1919
Manx general election
Manx general election
Manx general election